Swissôtel Tallinn is a luxury hotel in Tallinn, the capital of Estonia, and is managed by Swissôtel Hotels & Resorts. Swissôtel Tallinn is one of the Baltic's tallest hotels at a height of 117 metres (384 ft). This hotel is part of the Tornimäe complex, located in the heart of Tallinn, which consists of the hotel and a residential building. The hotel has 238 rooms and suites, 3 restaurants, 3 bars, a spa, and fitness center.

History
The contract to build this hotel was signed in 2004. Construction took over 3 years to complete. The ceremonial opening of the hotel took place on December 10, 2007. The Tornimäe Towers were designed by Meeli Truu from Nord Projekt AS. The interior decorator was Meelis Press Architects. Since January 2010 Swissôtel Tallinn is a member of Estonian Hotel and Restaurant Association.

Gallery

See also 

 List of tallest structures in Estonia
 List of tallest buildings in Estonia

References

External links

 The 35 Swissôtel' names worldwide

Hotels in Tallinn
Hotel buildings completed in 2007
Hotels established in 2007
2007 establishments in Estonia
Skyscrapers in Estonia
Twin towers
Skyscraper hotels